Piano Sonata No. 19 may refer to:
Piano Sonata No. 19 (Beethoven)
Piano Sonata No. 19 (Mozart)
Piano Sonata No. 19 (Schubert)